Dobrá Voda or Dobra Voda may refer to places:

Bosnia and Herzegovina
Dobra Voda (Modriča), a village in Modriča municipality

Croatia
Dobra Voda, a village in Benkovac municipality
Dobra Voda, a village in Čaglin municipality

Czech Republic
Dobrá Voda (Pelhřimov District), a municipality and village in the Vysočina Region
Dobrá Voda (Žďár nad Sázavou District), a municipality and village in the Vysočina Region
Dobrá Voda u Českých Budějovic, a municipality and village in the South Bohemian Region
Dobrá Voda u Hořic, a municipality and village in the Hradec Králové Region
Dobrá Voda u Pacova, a municipality and village in the Vysočina Region

Kosovo
Dobra Voda, a village in Klina municipality

Montenegro
Dobra Voda (Bar)

North Macedonia
Dobra Voda (peak), a mountain peak

Slovakia
Dobrá Voda, Trnava District, a municipality and village in the Trnava Region
Dobrá Voda castle, a castle in Dobrá Voda municipality